Microcephalic primordial dwarfism, Montreal type is a rare, multi-systemic genetic disorder that is characterized by cranio-facial dysmorphy, premature hair greying and balding, dry and wrinkled palms, skeletal abnormalities, cryptorchidism, premature dementia and intellectual disabilities of variable severity.

Presentation 

People with this disorder often  show the following symptoms:

 Normal birth weight but dwarfism later in life
 Early-onset dementia
 Premature hair greying and loss
 Wrinkled palms
 Small head (microcephaly)
 Big eyes
 Narrow face
 Receding chin
 Intellectual disabilities
 Abnormally small brain
 Cryptorchidism
 Prominent nose
 Low set ears
 Earlobe hypoplasia-aplasia

Etimology 

This disorder was discovered in the early fall of 1970, in Montreal, Canada, when Fitch et al. described a patient with a type of bird-headed dwarfism, he described the symptoms mentioned above, some of the symptoms suggested a diagnosis of either Werner syndrome, Seckel syndrome, Hallermann-Streiff syndrome, or Noonan syndrome. However, the authors thought there were differences that distinguished this particular case from any other syndrome, suggesting it to be separated into an entity of its own (which it did). No more cases of this disorder have been reported since then (1970).

References 

Genetic diseases and disorders
Intellectual disability
Rare diseases